Erkan Teper (born 18 June 1982) is a German professional boxer. He held the European heavyweight title in 2015, but was stripped by the EBU for failing a drug test.

Amateur career
As a super heavyweight amateur, Teper won silver medals at the 2006 German National Championships and the 2007 World Military Games. He won the 2009 Bolivarian Alternative Games in Santiago, Cuba.

Professional career

Teper vs. Price
Teper faced heavyweight contender David Price on 17 July 2015 for the EBU heavyweight title. He fought belligerently during the bout and knocked down Price in the 2nd round with a left hook. The fight was called off by the referee immediately resulting in a KO victory for Teper.

Doping allegations
Teper was supposed to face Robert Helenius on 19 December 2015, but cancelled the match due to a shoulder injury. Thus he had to give up the EBU Heavyweight title, which was then claimed by Helenius in a match against Franz Rill. It was later reported that Teper had failed a post-fight drug test after knocking out Price and is currently under investigation for unlawful possession of doping substances.

Professional boxing record

References

External links

German sportspeople in doping cases
1982 births
Living people
Doping cases in boxing
German male boxers
Heavyweight boxers
European Boxing Union champions
German people of Turkish descent
People from Ahlen
Sportspeople from Münster (region)